Dictyosporium is the type genus of fungi belonging to the family Dictyosporiaceae. By an estimate in 2018 it is formed by 45 species.

The species in this genus are saprobic on dead or decaying wood and can be found on dead wood and plant litter in both terrestrial and aquatic habitats.  The genus can be found worldwide, it has a cosmopolitan distribution. The type species is Dictyosporium elegans, which was described by August Carl Joseph Corda in  Witenweber (1836).

Family taxonomy

Dictyosporiaceae 
The family of this genus, Dictyosporiaceae, was created to accommodate a holomorphic group of Dothideomycetes, including 12 genera that are saprobes on decaying wood and plant debris in terrestrial and freshwater habitats. The latest genera to be included were Dictyocheirospora, Dictyopalmispora, Jalapriya and Vikalpa.

Dictyosporium 
The genus was analysed molecularly and was previously situated phylogenetically inside the Massariinaceae family. But in 2015 Tanka et al. changed its position and situated the genus inside the current family Dictyosporiaceae.

Dictyosporium is a paraphyletic genus and although since 2015 the family is correctly identified, the taxonomy of the genus is still unresolved and the number of species keeps changing.

Number of Species 
In 2012 Withon et al. added 11 species while Boonmee et al. removed 10 species from the genus. The next change was in 2013 when three new species were identified: D. aquaticum, D. meiosporum and  D. thailandicum. In 2015 D. araucariae, D. indicum, D. hydei, D. olivacesporum, D. pseudomusae, D. sexualis, D. splendidum and D. wuyiense were newly identified. By 2017 the genus had 43 species while in 2018 two new species were identified (D. tubulatum and D. tratense) and the genus was formed by 45 species.

Morphological characteristics 
The teleomorph is characterized by a dark brown, subglobose, superficial ascocarp. It has bitunicate, cylindrical asci. The ascospores are fusiform, hyaline, uniseptate with or without sheath. 

The anamorph is characterized for producing sporodochial or effuse conidiomata. They produce branched colonies, cheroid, from pale brown to yellowish brown, smooth conidia with 4-7 parallel rows of cells. The conidiophores are inconspicuous. 

Dictyosporium is a heterogenous paraphyletic assemblage of species and the characters of some can differ from the type species. The principal characteristic used to differentiate between species is the conidia size and the number of row cells. 

The diagnostic features that separates Distyosporium from Massarinaceae are their conidia features.

Species
, Species Fungorum accepts 60 species of Dictyosporium.
Dictyosporium acroinflatum 
Dictyosporium alatum 
Dictyosporium amoenum 
Dictyosporium appendiculatum 
Dictyosporium aquaticum 
Dictyosporium araucariae 
Dictyosporium binatum 
Dictyosporium biseriale 
Dictyosporium boydii 
Dictyosporium brahmaswaroopii 
Dictyosporium bulbosum 
Dictyosporium campaniforme 
Dictyosporium canisporum 
Dictyosporium castaneum 
Dictyosporium cocophylum 
Dictyosporium crustaceum 
Dictyosporium digitatum 
Dictyosporium elegans 
Dictyosporium foliicola 
Dictyosporium gauntii 
Dictyosporium guttulatum 
Dictyosporium hongkongensis 
Dictyosporium hughesii 
Dictyosporium hymenaearum 
Dictyosporium krabiense 
Dictyosporium lakefuxianense 
Dictyosporium manglietiae 
Dictyosporium marinum 
Dictyosporium meiosporum 
Dictyosporium minus 
Dictyosporium muriformis 
Dictyosporium nigroapice 
Dictyosporium oblongum 
Dictyosporium olivaceosporum 
Dictyosporium palmae 
Dictyosporium pandani 
Dictyosporium pandanicola 
Dictyosporium pelagicum 
Dictyosporium polystichum 
Dictyosporium prolificum 
Dictyosporium rhopalostylidis 
Dictyosporium schizostachyfolium 
Dictyosporium sexuale 
Dictyosporium sinense 
Dictyosporium solanii 
Dictyosporium splendidum 
Dictyosporium stellatum 
Dictyosporium strelitziae 
Dictyosporium taishanense 
Dictyosporium tetraseriale 
Dictyosporium tetrasporum 
Dictyosporium thailandicum 
Dictyosporium tratense 
Dictyosporium triramosum 
Dictyosporium triseriale 
Dictyosporium tubulatum 
Dictyosporium wuyiense 
Dictyosporium yerbae 
Dictyosporium yunnanense 
Dictyosporium zeylanicum 
Dictyosporium zhejiangense

References

Pleosporales
Dothideomycetes genera
Taxa named by August Carl Joseph Corda
Taxa described in 1836